Alfred Groß (1893–1949) was a district leader and mayor of Erlangen (Germany) during Nazism. He was member of the Nazi party (NSDAP).

Biography 
Groß was born in Bamberg and trained as a school teacher. After a pausing his career during his fighting in World War I, he resumed teaching in Erlangen.

In 1925 he joined the NSDAP and became district leader of the local area. In 1938, Groß was sent to Graz to organize the Nazi Party. In 1944, he was deposed in favor of Herbert Ohly who remained mayor until the end of the war in 1945. During this time Groß was again serving as district leader of Erlangen.

References 

1893 births
1949 deaths
Nazi politicians
Mayors of Erlangen